Otra película de huevos y un pollo (Spanish for Another Movie about Eggs and a Chick) is a Mexican animated adventure comedy film produced by a Mexican animation studio Huevocartoon Producciones, and is the sequel to Una Película de Huevos, as part of the Huevos film series.

The film was released in Mexico on 20 March 2009, which was a major commercial success, grossing a total of $113.9 million pesos (US$6.1 million).

Along with its predecessor, this film was released direct-to-video as a "2-Pack" in the United States.

Plot
The film begins in a ghost town inhabited by a stone amulet shaped like an egg who is a great sorcerer. One day, the egg-Wizard prepares to make a spell that has so long been waiting. Passing the list of ingredients, he learns that one is missing: a chicken heart.

In the "Granjas: El Pollon" Toto, a beautiful chick, learns to eat a worm. He also reflects on his former life as an egg. Soon after, he is kidnapped by buzzard eggs, leading to the desert.

The next morning, Willy, Bibi, Confi, Coco, and other friends manage to get to the desert in a supply truck that has been stolen from its owner. In this ghost town, Toto meets face to face with the egg-Wizard, who begins to make his recipe as expected, and, on reaching the ingredient chicken heart, the chicken would have to be sacrificed first. But Toto escapes and goes into the vast desert, where he loses consciousness. The Egg-Wizard calls an army of scorpion eggs to bring back Toto.

In return, Toto's friends know the Roe Boat and manage to find Toto, who has recovered from his faint and then about to be attacked by the scorpion eggs. The gang manages to save Toto, but at one point, Willy is stung by a scorpion egg and later it is discovered that the shell is rotting. The boat Roe proposes that go with Old Egg Hawk, to which Bacon and Toto access immediately.

That night, the Egg-Wizard is informed of these events and forms a new army, which before were empty shells. Meanwhile, Toto and Bacon help dig out the scorpion eggs that have been frozen in the cold of the night. They consult with the Old Hawk Egg, but they themselves are the answer: to use medicinal plants to fix the shell of Willy.

At dawn, it is reported that the egg-Wizard needs the heart before sunset, otherwise it will be forced to appear in person. All eggs choose to fight. In the sunset, the battle starts with a large army of egg-Zombies, which were defeated by the scorpion eggs thanks to Toto and Tocino freeing them from ice and then bred with Egg-Wizard-mounted two-brand toy cars " Matchbox " and an iguana. But all are defeated. Then Coco and Bacon derail the toy cars, sending the buzzard eggs to stay with the huevitas underground, making a reference to semi-abandoned women. Finally, it is revealed that the iguana was and is the mother of Iguano.

The eggs come to the climax where the egg-Witch fights face to face with Toto, revealing that the chicken heart wants to "feel and love". He loses his magic and is defeated and sent to the sky at the last minute by Willy, who has been cured of his wound and is "lighter" than before from the plants in his shell. The story ends with Toto, returning to his farm and his mother and having a big party with all his friends. After the credits, the witch egg falls on the floor and is eaten by Cuache, who in the end goes to the bathroom, and Tlacua tells him that it will hurt.

Original voice actor 
Bruno Bichir as Toto, a serious but caring chick.
Carlos Espejel as Willy, a chicken egg and an ex-sergeant, he now is a medic egg. He is a good friend of Toto and Tocino and Bibi's boyfriend.
Angélica Vale as Bibi, a spoiled chicken egg which works on a juggling act in a fair with her brothers. She is Willy's girlfriend.
Darío T. Pie as Huevo Brujo, an eccentric stone wizard egg. He wants Toto's heart to make spell which will make him feel. His minions are the buzzard eggs, Manotas and Patotas, an iguana (formerly), and zombie-eggs. The scorpion eggs aren't his minions, more than mercenaries that he hired.
Lucila Mariscal as La Hueva-Lancha, an ugly and kind yard egg who helps Willy and his friends to find Toto. She lives in an abandoned supermarket with other 7 yard eggs.
Patricio Castillo is El Viejo Huevo de Halcón, a wise hawk egg who lives in top of a mountain, he hasn't hatched (despite being 75 years old) by using some type of medicinal plants.
Humberto Velez as Huevay II, a chocolate egg and Confi's best friend. His speech and behavior probably states he is Cuban. He melts several times in the movie.
Rodolfo Riva Palacio Alatriste as Coco, a theater-loving and dramatic crocodile egg. He is the leader of the reptile eggs. / Iguano, a dim-witted but very strong iguana egg, he is Coco's second-in command. / Manotas, a stupid ostrich egg who cares a lot for his brother Patotas. He is shown to be a little more smart than Patotas, and has black eyes instead of blue to tell him apart from Patotas. / Cuache, an easygoing opossum.
Gabriel Riva Palacio Alatriste as Confi, the most prominent of all of the confetti eggs (who are also named Confi) he is a parody of hippies and drug users, and most confetti eggs follow his stupid prayers/ Patotas, a stupid ostrich egg who cares a lot for Manotas. He has blue eyes and his tongue sticking out. / Torti, a strong but slow tortoise egg. / Huevo de Escorpión, one of the scorpion eggs and the one who stung Willy.
Fernando Meza as Tlacua, a serious opossum / Lagartijo, an emotionally unstable lizard egg. / Huevo de Escorpión Líder, the leader of the scorpion eggs. He sports a punk hairstyle.
Armando Gonzalez as Apolononio, one of the buzzard eggs.
Tocino, a mute and friendly strip of bacon. He only communicates by body signs and people usually use him as a weapon or a tool due his flexibility and greasiness.

Release
The film was released in Mexico on 20 March 2009. While the film, along with its predecessor, was released on DVD in the United States as a "2-Pack", neither film were released in any major format in the country due to their "racist" and "controversial" nature, failing to match the industry's humor code and have no English subtitles or dubs.

Reception
A reviewer of Cine Premiere has rated the film 3 stars out of 5, praising the animation and story balance while criticizing its adult content.

Sequels

A third film, called Un gallo con muchos huevos (Spanish for A Rooster With Many Eggs''') was released on 20 August 2015 in Mexico, and the United States on 4 September 2015. It was followed by Un rescate de huevitos released in August 2021.

The fifth and final installment, titled Huevitos congelados, is currently in development and will be released in 2022.

See also
 Una Película de Huevos Un gallo con muchos huevos Marcianos vs. Mexicanos''

References

External links
Official Site

IMCINE profile (in Spanish)

2009 films
2009 comedy films
2009 fantasy films
2009 animated films
2000s Mexican films
2000s children's adventure films
2000s children's comedy films
2000s children's fantasy films
2000s children's animated films
2000s adventure comedy films
2000s fantasy comedy films
2000s Spanish-language films
Mexican animated films
Mexican children's films
Mexican adventure comedy films
Mexican fantasy comedy films
Mexican sequel films
Animated adventure films
Animated comedy films
Animated fantasy films
Animated films about chickens
Films about food and drink
Films about kidnapping
Films set in Mexico
Films set on farms
Films set in 2009
Eggs in culture